Remacemide is a drug which acts as a low-affinity NMDA antagonist with sodium channel blocking properties.  It has been studied for the treatment of acute ischemic stroke, epilepsy, Huntington's disease, and Parkinson's disease.

Because remacemide has only a modest effect on seizure frequency and causes dizziness, it is no longer believed that remacemide will be an effective treatment for epilepsy. Although no such statement has been made about remacemide's potential for treating stroke, Huntington's, or Parkinson's, remacemide is no longer being developed for these conditions.

Remacemide is also known as remacemide hydrochloride, (±)-2-amino-N-(1-methyl-1,2-diphenylethyl)-acetamide hydrochloride, or FPL 12924AA.

Adverse effects
dizziness
nausea

Lack of adverse effects
Unlike many other treatments for epilepsy, remacemide does not appear to impair cognitive performance or driving performance in humans, although the evidence for effects on cognitive performance in animals has been mixed. 
Remacemide is not a sedative.

Toxicity
The median toxic dose of remacemide for neural impairment tests in mice is 5.6 mg/kg.
Its estimated median lethal dose is about 927.3 mg/kg in mice.
It has a favorable therapeutic index of 28.1 in mice.

Drug interactions

Levodopa
Remacemide delays the absorption of levodopa (300 mg of remacemide one hour before levodopa treatment delays mean time to peak levodopa plasma concentration by 20%) but not its total absorption (area-under-the-curve for levodopa plasma concentration was unchanged).

Sodium valproate
Remacemide does not interact with sodium valproate, a treatment for epilepsy.

Carbamazepine
Ramacemide does interact with carbamazepine.  Remacemide inhibits the metabolism of carbamazepine, while carbamazepine induces the metabolism of remacemide and FPL 12495.

Alcohol

Remacemide salts
Remacemide is most commonly synthesized as the salt remacemide hydrochloride.  However, there has been some investigation into other remacemide salts and their crystals, as different remacemide salts might taste more pleasant or have a solubility more suitable for a pediatric suspension formulation.

Mechanism of action
Remacemide binds weakly and noncompetitively to the ionic channel site of the NMDA receptor complex. Remacemide binds both allosterically and in the channel. 
However, because remacemide binds so weakly to NMDAR, much of remacemide's in vivo effect against excitotoxicity is thought to be caused by its metabolic transformation to the more potent desglycine derivative FPL 12495.  That is, remacemide may actually act as a prodrug to deliver the active metabolite FPL 12495 to the central nervous system.

Epilepsy
In a well validated and described genetic model of absence epilepsy, rats of the WAG/Rij strain, remacemide and its metabolite FPL 12495 were found to have a common for glutamate antagonist usual effect on the number of spike/wave dischargesEEG, the drugs decrease spike/wave discharges dose dependently. However, in contrast to most other glutamate antagonists, FPL 12495 increased the duration of the spike-wave discharges.

Pharmacokinetics

Blood–brain barrier
The brain uptake index (BUI), a measure of a drug's ability to pass the blood–brain barrier that involves the injection of radiolabeled test and reference substances into the common carotid artery of anesthetized animals, for remacemide is 51 ± 0.9 SD.

Enantiomers
The (-)stereoisomer of remacemide is of equal potency to the racemic mixture in preventing maximal electroshock seizures when administered orally to rats, while the (+)stereoisomer is less potent.

Metabolites

FPL 12495
Much of remacemide's effect in vivo is thought to be caused by the desglycine derivative FPL 12495 (±).
FPL 12495 (±) binds specifically and non-competitively to NMDAR.  Its effect on maximal electroconvulsive shock is more potent than remacemide.  The S isomer (FPL 12859) is even more potent than the racemic mixture, while the R isomer is less potent than the racemate.

FPL 12495 is sometimes referred to as ARL 12495AA.

Other metabolites

FPL 15053
FPL 15053 is the N- of remacemide, and exhibits modest binding to NMDAR and modest effects on convulsions and mortality in test mice and rats.

FPL 14331 and FPL 14465
FPL 14331 and FPL 14465 are the p- of remacemide, and they exhibit some efficacy against maximal electroconvulsive shock after i.p. and i.v. dosing.

FPL 15455
FPL 15455 is an oxoacetate metabolite of remacemide, but has no demonstrated biological activity.

FPL 14991 and FPL 14981
FPL 14991 and FPL 14981 are both β- of remacemide, and they display modest efficacy against maximal electroconvulsive shock in mice.  However FPL 14981 and not FPL 14991 prevents NMDLA-induced convulsions and mortality in mice.

FPL 13592 and FPL 15112
The hydroxy-methyl derivative of remacemide (FPL 13592) and its  (FPL 15112) prevents electric shock-induced convulsions only after i.v. administration; only the desglycine derivative binds to NMDAR.

FPL 14467
FPL 14467 (p-) is inactive in vivo and weak in binding NMDAR.

Pharmacodynamics

History

Current status
Remacemide is an experimental drug most recently being developed by the British multinational pharmaceutical company AstraZeneca.  However, there has been little news of its progress since 2000.  A few sources indicate that its development has been discontinued.

Changing hands
Remacemide was one of the last drugs under development by the now-defunct English pharmaceutical company Fisons.  In 1995, it was acquired along with most of Fisons' research and development operations by the Swedish pharmaceutical company Astra, which in 1999 merged with the British company Zeneca to form AstraZeneca.  In 2000, AstraZeneca considered possibly licensing out remacemide to some other pharmaceutical company, but there has been little news about remacemide since then.  Remacemide's development may have been discontinued in July 2001.

Discovery and development under Fisons
In 1990, researchers at Fisons found that remacemide acted as an anticonvulsant in mice and rats 
.  Because of remacemide's potential as a neuroprotective agent through preventing glutamate toxicity, it was soon also under investigation as a treatment for Huntington's disease and Parkinson's disease.

Astra
By 1995, when Astra acquired remacemide, it was already in Phase IIb clinical development as an anti-epileptic drug and Phase I clinical development as a treatment for Huntington's
.

AstraZeneca
By 1998, when Astra announced its merger with Zeneca, remacemide had progressed to Phase III trials for epilepsy and Phase II trials for Parkinson's disease, and Astra was also investigating its potential for treating neuropathic pain

In 1999, after the merger, AstraZeneca reported that they were investigating remacemide for its neuroprotective effects, and that they planned regulatory submissions for Huntington's disease in 2001 and for Parkinson's disease and epilepsy in 2003.

Remacemide, under the trade name Ecovia, was designated an orphan drug for the treatment of Huntington's disease by the FDA in March 2000.

Remacemide was last mentioned in AstraZeneca's reports on its R&D pipeline in 2000, when it was in Phase III clinical trials for remacemide in the treatment of Huntington's disease and Phase II for treatment of Parkinson's disease.  At that time, the submission of the New Drug Application (NDA) to the FDA and the Marketing Authorization Application to the CHMP was projected for Huntington's in 2001 and for Parkinson's after 2003, but there has been no news of such submission.  In this report, it was also noted that remacemide was "under strategic review and a potential candidate for licensing activity" (see this external article about drug licensing.)

Current news
There are no clinical trials of remacemide in progress, according to the Huntington Study Group, and the Parkinson Study Group.

Availability
Remacemide is an experimental drug not available to the public and not currently undergoing clinical trials.

See also 
 AD-1211
 Diphenidine
 Ephenidine
 Lanicemine
 Lefetamine
 Methoxphenidine (MXP)
 MT-45

References

External links 
 Huntington's Outreach Project for Education, at Stanford

Acetamides
Amino acid derivatives
Dissociative drugs
NMDA receptor antagonists
Diarylethylamines
Sodium channel blockers